Unidad Popular may refer to:

 Popular Unity (Chile), a left-wing political alliance in Chile that supported Salvador Allende in 1970
 Popular Unity (Spain), a left-wing political alliance in Spain founded in 2015

See also 
 Popular Unity (disambiguation)